Die Wicherts von nebenan is a German television series that aired 1986–1991.

See also
List of German television series

External links
 

1986 German television series debuts
1991 German television series endings
German-language television shows
ZDF original programming